The Americas Zone was one of the three zones of the regional Davis Cup competition in 2017.

In the Americas Zone there were three different tiers, called groups, in which teams competed against each other to advance to the upper tier. Winners in Group III advanced to the Americas Zone Group II in 2018. All other teams remained in Group III.

Participating nations

Inactive nations

These nations decided not to compete in the 2017 Davis Cup.

Draw

Date: 12–17 June 2017

Location: Carrasco Lawn Tennis Club, Montevideo, Uruguay (clay)

Format: Round-robin basis. Two pools of four and five teams, respectively (Pools A and B). The winner of each pool plays off against the runner-up of the other pool to determine which two nations are promoted to Americas Zone Group II in 2018.

Seeding: The seeding was based on the Davis Cup Rankings of 10 April 2017 (shown in parentheses below).

Pool A

Pool B 

Standings are determined by: 1. number of wins; 2) If two teams have the same number of wins, head-to-head record; 3) If three teams have the same number of wins, (a) number of matches won in the group, then (b) percentage of sets won in the group, then (c) percentage of games won in the group, then (d) Davis Cup rankings.

Playoffs 

 and  promoted to Group II in 2018.

Round robin

Group A

Uruguay vs. Cuba

Costa Rica vs. Panama

Uruguay vs. Panama

Costa Rica vs. Cuba

Uruguay vs. Costa Rica

Cuba vs. Panama

Group B

Honduras vs. Antigua and Barbuda

Jamaica vs. Bermuda

Puerto Rico vs. Jamaica

Bermuda vs. Antigua and Barbuda

Puerto Rico vs. Antigua and Barbuda

Honduras vs. Bermuda

Puerto Rico vs. Bermuda

Honduras vs. Jamaica

Puerto Rico vs. Honduras

Jamaica vs. Antigua and Barbuda

Playoffs

Promotional playoffs

Uruguay vs. Honduras

Puerto Rico vs. Costa Rica

5th place playoff

Panama vs. Jamaica

7th place playoff

Cuba vs. Bermuda

References

External links
Official Website

Americas Zone Group III
Davis Cup Americas Zone